Segun Akinola (born 1993) is an English composer for television and documentaries. He took over from Murray Gold as the director and composer of the music for Doctor Who from "The Woman Who Fell To Earth" in 2018 until "The Power of the Doctor" in 2022.

Early life 

Akinola has British-Nigerian heritage. As a child he learned to play piano and drums. He is an alumnus of Bedford Modern School, and the Royal Birmingham Conservatoire, from where he graduated with first-class honours in 2014. He subsequently obtained an MA in Composing for Film and Television, at the National Film and Television School.

Work

Doctor Who 
On 26 June 2018, Doctor Who executive producer Chris Chibnall announced that the musical score for the eleventh series of the programme would be provided by Akinola. Akinola returned to compose for the twelfth and thirteenth series, as well as the 2022 specials. On 20 July 2022, Akinola announced that he had made the decision to depart alongside Chris Chibnall and Jodie Whittaker, and that "The Power of the Doctor" would be his last episode as composer for the show.

Recognition 

He was named a BAFTA  Breakthrough Brit in 2017.

His "Dear Mr Shakespeare" score was given an Honourable Mention in the 2017 BSO Jerry Goldsmith Award for Best Original Score for a Short Film.

In 2019, Segun Akinola received a nomination at the Screen Nation Awards in the "Rising Star" category. He was nominated for his work on Black and British: A Forgotten History, Doctor Who, and Wonders of the Moon.

Personal life 

Akinola lives in London.

Music

References

External links
 BAFTA profile including video of Akinola speaking
 
 

1993 births
Living people
21st-century British composers
Alumni of Birmingham Conservatoire
Alumni of the National Film and Television School
English people of Nigerian descent
English film score composers
English male film score composers
English male composers
English television composers
Music based on Doctor Who
People educated at Bedford Modern School
Place of birth missing (living people)